Kara is a genus of air-breathing land snails, terrestrial pulmonate gastropod mollusks in the family Orthalicidae. 

Kara was previously a subgenus of Thaumastus; it was elevated to genus level in 2011.

Species
Species within the genus Kara include:
 Kara cadwaladeri (Pilsbry, 1930)
 Kara indentata (da Costa, 1901)
 Kara ortiziana (F. Haas, 1955)
 Kara thompsonii (Pfeiffer, 1845) - type species of the (sub)genus Kara
 Thaumastus thompsonoides Oberwimmer, 1931
 Kara viriata (Morelet, 1863)
 Kara yanamensis (Morelet, 1863)

References

 Bank, R. A. (2017). Classification of the Recent terrestrial Gastropoda of the World. Last update: July 16th, 2017

External links
 Breure, A. S. H. & Araujo, R. (2017). The Neotropical land snails (Mollusca, Gastropoda) collected by the “Comisión Científica del Pacífico.”. PeerJ. 5, e3065

Orthalicidae